This is a listing of the horses that finished in either first, second, or third place and the number of starters in the Kentucky Oaks, the first leg of the de facto American Triple Tiara of Thoroughbred Racing, an American Grade 1 race for three-year-old fillies at  miles (9 furlongs) on the dirt held at Churchill Downs in Louisville, Kentucky.

See also 
 Kentucky Derby top four finishers
 List of graded stakes at Churchill Downs

References 

Lists of horse racing results
Churchill Downs
Kentucky Oaks
Louisville, Kentucky-related lists